Boumerdassi may refer to:
 Zawiyet Sidi Boumerdassi is a zawiya in Algeria.
 Cheikh Boumerdassi is an Algerian Sufi, theologian and leader of Mokrani Revolt in 1871.
 Mohamed Boumerdassi is an Algerian artist and Bedouin singer.
 Nadia Boumerdassi is an Algerian artist and Chaabi singer.

See also
Boumerdès (disambiguation)

Boumerdassi family